Alice Elizabeth Doherty (March 14, 1887 – June 13, 1933) was an American woman born with the condition hypertrichosis lanuginosa.

Biography

Doherty was born in Minneapolis, Minnesota, with approximately two-inch long blonde hair all over her body. None of her relatives are known to have had a similar condition. She had blue eyes. Doherty suffered from hypertrichosis lanuginosa. Although this is very rare, other individuals were known for their similar appearances: Fedor Jeftichew ("Jo-Jo the Dog-faced Man"), Stephan Bibrowski ("Lionel the Lion-faced Man"), Jesús "Chuy" Aceves ("Wolfman"), and Annie Jones ("the bearded woman"). Hypertrichosis has many different variations, including differences in causation. 

She was exhibited by her parents as a sideshow attraction from as early as the age of two. Later she was presented commercially by her mother and Professor Weller’s One-Man Band throughout the Midwestern United States. She was consistently shown as a standalone exhibit in store front exhibitions. Doherty was never interested in entertainment, but continued to perform to support her family, anxiously awaiting retirement. 

She retired from the entertainment business in 1915 and died of bronchial pneumonia in Dallas, Texas on June 13, 1933, aged 46.

References

1887 births
1933 deaths
People from Minneapolis
People with hypertrichosis
Sideshow attractions
Women in Minnesota